Holmesland is a surname. Notable people with the surname include:

Eilif Løvrak Holmesland (1896–1954), Norwegian jurist and politician
Peder Johan Pedersen Holmesland (1833–1914), Norwegian politician
Peter Karl Holmesland (1866–1933), Norwegian jurist and politician
Simon Pedersen Holmesland (1823–1895), Norwegian politician